UKS Hærens Samband (short form SBUKS) is a military station located on Jørstadmoen outside Lillehammer in central-eastern Norway. Their main task is to provide intelligence, personnel and signalling equipment to all units in the Norwegian Defence Force.  SBUKS was called Sambandsregimentet until 2000 and have been situated on Jørstadmoen since 1947.

External links 
SBUKS

Norwegian Army